Jacqueline Anne Oatley  (born 28 December 1974) is an English broadcaster.

She is a football commentator for Sky Sports, calling Premier League and FA Women's Super League matches. She is also a sports presenter on Quest TV channel, covering the English Football League, and is podcast host for The Athletic. Oatley also provides live match commentary on the UEFA Champions League and UEFA internationals. She is also anchor of the ITV Sport live darts coverage. In 2007, she became the first female commentator on the flagship BBC One football highlights programme Match of the Day which she presented once in March 2015. She has anchored and commentated on several major football tournaments and Olympic Games, starting with UEFA Women's Euro 2005, latterly fronting Euro 2016 and the 2018 FIFA World Cup for ITV Sport. She was a live match commentator for the host broadcaster's world TV feed on-site at the 2019 FIFA Women's World Cup in France.

An FA-qualified football coach, an ambassador for Women in Football and a national committee member of the Football Writers' Association, Oatley was the UK's first female darts presenter, covering Professional Darts Corporation tournaments on ITV4 and the BBC's flagship sports news radio show, Sportsweek on BBC Radio 5 Live. In August 2015, Oatley was named the eighth most influential woman in sport by The Independent.

She has also fronted Final Score for the BBC and The Football League Show, completing the set of five broadcast roles on the show, and World Football Focus.  She has been the darts anchor for ITV Sport since 2015, hosting their live international PDC events. She had previously presented ITV's 2015 Africa Cup of Nations coverage and in 2014 anchored their FA Cup highlights programmes.

Oatley fronted the BBC's live women's football coverage including the 2015 FIFA Women's World Cup, the UEFA Women's Euro 2013 and the BBC Women's Football Show. She has been a studio guest pundit on TV2 in Norway and the Guardian Football Weekly podcast.

In the summer of 2021, she co-hosted the BBC Radio 5 Live 'Drive' news show with Tony Livesey.

Oatley was appointed Member of the Order of the British Empire (MBE) in the 2016 New Year Honours for services to broadcasting and diversity in sport. The award was recognition of her work behind the scenes championing the role of women working in football as well as women's football.

In September 2016, Oatley was made an Honorary Doctor of Letters at the University of Wolverhampton for her contribution to sports broadcasting.

Biography
Oatley was born in Wolverhampton on 28 December 1974. She was brought up in Codsall, South Staffordshire. Her late father Gerald was the managing director of a large gas appliance company; her mother Sonja is a retired nurse who was born and brought up in South Africa, where her parents were Norwegian missionaries. Her cousin in South Africa was a Springboks cricket selector, while his brother was a rally driver who twice won the Roof of Africa.

Education
In her childhood, Oatley developed a love of watching and playing football. She is a fan of Wolverhampton Wanderers. She attended the all-girls junior school, St Dominic's in Brewood, Staffordshire. Oatley passed her A-Levels at Wolverhampton Grammar School, and studied at University of Leeds, graduating with a degree in German in 1996.

Oatley spent a year travelling the world, and then moved to London to work in intellectual property as a Sales and Marketing Manager, then Key Account Manager. While playing amateur football for Chiswick Ladies Football Club, Oatley sustained a dislocated knee cap and ruptured ligaments, which resulted in a reconstruction operation and ten months recovering on crutches. With further operations to follow, she was told she would no longer be able to play sport. That news prompted her decision to change career and train to become a journalist, with the aim of working in sport – particularly her beloved football.

Journalism career

Oatley initially studied print journalism and radio production at evening classes while broadcasting on hospital radio. She then gave up her intellectual property management job as well as her flat, spent a summer sleeping on friends' floors whilst doing journalism work experience full-time. She undertook a Postgraduate Diploma (PgDip) in Broadcast Journalism at Sheffield Hallam University. While studying she joined BBC Radio Leeds as a sports reporter, continuing to work there after graduation. Her first commentary was on a match between Wakefield & Emley and Worksop Town in the Unibond League.

Oatley also worked as a news reporter in her native West Midlands with BBC WM, before moving back to London to work as a sports reporter for BBC London 94.9. She joined BBC Radio 5 Live in 2003 and became the first woman to commentate on a football match on British network radio in 2005, covering the England women's internationals at the 2005 UEFA Women's Championship. Her subsequent interview with UEFA President Lennart Johansson became an international news story due to his controversial comments on women's football.

Oatley became the first female football commentator in the history of BBC football programme Match of the Day, with her debut broadcast on 21 April 2007 for the Premier League match between Fulham F.C. and Blackburn Rovers F.C. She has since commentated on several further games for Match of the Day.

Oatley was the Austria-based reporter for BBC Television at Euro 2008, reported and commentated at the Women's World Cup in China in 2007 and presented and commentated on a television show Level Up during the World Cup in Germany in 2006. She commentated on live football matches for BBC Television during the Beijing Olympics. In September 2009, she commentated on the Euro 2009 final between Germany and England and did several live commentaries for BBC Radio 5 Live at the 2010 FIFA World Cup in South Africa. She was BBC Television reporter with the Great Britain women's Olympic football team for the 2012 Summer Olympics.

In 2013 and 2014 Oatley hosted Late Kick Off on BBC One in London and the South East and anchored UEFA Women's Euro 2013. She was also a reporter on Football Focus and Final Score on BBC One and a Premier League presenter on their worldwide television channel, produced by IMG.

She was a regular sports presenter on the BBC News Channel between 2011 and 2013.

She fronted The FA WSL Show in 2012 for ESPN (UK) 

She has previously presented sports news on BBC Radio 1, BBC Radio 2 and BBC Radio 4, as well as more frequently on BBC Radio 5 Live. She has covered the World Snooker Championship, British Moto GP, Open Championship golf, and various other sports such as tennis and rugby league.

Oatley also appears regularly on Sky Sports programming, currently as a match reporter on Soccer Saturday and has stand-in presented Goals on Sunday and Sunday Supplement. She was announced as the new presenter of Sunday Supplement, taking over from Neil Ashton, on 14 January 2020 until the show was cancelled following the COVID-19 lockdown.

Oatley resumed her association football main (play-by-play) commentary career in 2019 when she called 7 FIFA Women's World Cup 2019 matches for the Host Broadcast Services (HBS) "world feed" on site from Roazhon Park in Rennes, France.

Oatley became the lead main (play-by-play) commentator of FA Women's Super League matches on Sky Sports in the UK in September 2021.

Oatley has been hired by FOX Sports (US) as a main (play-by-play) commentator of men's FIFA World Cup 2022.

Personal
Oatley is married to Jamie, who is an events planner. They live in Hinchley Wood, Esher, Surrey, in southwest Greater London. She gave birth to daughter Phoebe in 2011 and son Max in 2014.

References

External links

Guardian Life and Style Jacqui Oatley
Jacqui Oatley on Twitter
Streetgames My Sporting Life Jacqui Oatley
Politics.co.uk Jacqui Oatley

1974 births
Living people
People from Wolverhampton
People from Codsall
English people of South African descent
People educated at Wolverhampton Grammar School
Alumni of the University of Leeds
Alumni of Sheffield Hallam University
English journalists
English radio personalities
BBC Radio 5 Live presenters
English association football commentators
Members of the Order of the British Empire
English people of Norwegian descent
Women association football commentators